UBT or Ubt may refer to:

UBT (band), formerly Uncle Bad Touch, a side project of Mikey Heppner of Priestess (band)
UBT machine gun a variant of the Berezin UB  machine-gun
Unbitrium, symbol Ubt for '123', is a theoretical chemical element
Borneo Tarakan University (Universitas Borneo Tarakan), a university in Indonesia
Urea breath test